The Soviet Union's 1966 nuclear test series was a group of 18 nuclear tests conducted in 1966. These tests  followed the 1965 Soviet nuclear tests series and preceded the 1967 Soviet nuclear tests series.

References

1966
1966 in the Soviet Union
1966 in military history
Explosions in 1966